The Parliamentary Papers Act 1840 (3 & 4 Vict c 9) is an Act of the Parliament of the United Kingdom. The Act was passed in response to the case of Stockdale v Hansard where it was held that the House of Commons enjoyed no privilege as to publications under its authority circulated beyond Members of Parliament.

Provisions
The Act provides that:
Publications under the House's authority enjoy absolute privilege against civil or criminal proceedings (s.1);
Correct copies of such publications also enjoy absolute privilege (s.2);
Extracts are protected by qualified privilege. The burden of proof is on the defendant to show that the publication was without malice (s.3).

Publication for circulation among Members of Parliament is protected by absolute privilege under common law. The Act received Royal Assent on 14 April 1840.

The Act is notable by being ex post facto – it changes the legal status of happenings before the Act was passed. As such, it is a precedent showing that Parliament has sovereignty over the past as well as the future.

See also
Defamation Act 1952, s.9(1)
Broadcasting Act 1990, s.203(1)

References

Bibliography
Text of the Parliamentary Papers Act, without amendments

A Collection of the Public General Statutes passed in the Third and Fourth Year of the Reign of Her Majesty Queen Victoria, 1840. Printed by George E Eyre and Andrew Spottiswoode, printers to the Queen's most excellent majesty. London. 1840. Pages 99 to 100.

United Kingdom Acts of Parliament 1840
United Kingdom public law